Oriane Moulin (born ) is a Belgian female volleyball player. She is part of the Belgium women's national volleyball team.

She participated in the 2018 FIVB Volleyball Women's Nations League.
On club level she played for Tchalou Volley.

References

External links
 FIVB profile
 http://www.lanouvellegazette.be/28357/article/2017-01-04/la-volleyeuse-oriane-moulin-selectionnee-en-u20-16-ans
 http://www.laprovince.be/110225/article/2017-08-03/o-moulin-reve-de-faire-partie-des-meilleures-joueuses-du-pays

2000 births
Living people
Belgian women's volleyball players
Place of birth missing (living people)
Liberos
21st-century Belgian women